Me Quedo Sola is the first album by the Mexican singer Paty Cantú, launched in 2009. That same year a special edition of the album was released.

Track listing
 Un Amor 
 No Fue Suficiente
 Déjame Ir
 Pensarás En Mí
 Sólo Por Estar
 Me Quedo Sola
 Ayúdame A No Llorar
 Fui Una Más
 Eclipse
 Quiero Todo, Quiero Nada

Charts

Weekly charts

Year-end charts

References

2009 debut albums
Paty Cantú albums